The Lomami red colobus (Piliocolobus parmentieri) is a type of red colobus monkey from central Africa.  Historically it had been treated as a subspecies of the Central African red colobus, (P. foai) but more recent taxonomies generally treat it as a separate species.  

The Lomani red colobus has a limited range in lowland tropical rainforest between the Lomani River and the Lualaba River in central Democratic Republic of the Congo. Its range extends as far south as the Ruiki River and the Lutanga River. It eats leaves, fruit, flowers, buds and possibly seeds.

References

Piliocolobus
Primates of Africa
Mammals described in 1987
Mammals of the Democratic Republic of the Congo
Endemic fauna of the Democratic Republic of the Congo